Kimmie Weeks (born December 6, 1981) is a Liberian human rights activist.

Early years

Born in Monrovia, Liberia, in 1981, Kimmie Weeks was nine years old when he experienced the First Liberian Civil War at first hand.  He and his mother, Estina Ntow, were forced to leave their home and marched with many other displaced Liberians to a refugee camp set up in university buildings.  A classroom filled to capacity with 30 people became his home.  While in the camp, Kimmie became deathly ill - dehydrated due to cholera, he also contracted chickenpox and yellow jaundice. He saw no doctor, no nurse and was administered no medicine except for a few herbs. When other refugees sharing the classroom with them could no longer find a pulse in Kimmie, it was decided, over his mother's objections, that he had died. He was thrown still alive onto one of many piles of dead bodies in the refugee camp. Kimmie's mother refused to accept that he was dead.  She searched until she found his body and resuscitated him, beating on his chest and shaking him until he regained consciousness. That same night, Kimmie vowed to dedicate the rest of his childhood and adult life to making the world a better place for children.

His early projects were small community-based initiatives, which he and groups of children his age carried out to help their own community.  At the age of 14, he heard about the Convention on the Rights of the Child (CRC) for the first time and began to organize community initiatives to promote the CRC and the concept that "children should be seen AND heard."

Initial projects

Weeks co-founded Voice of the Future Inc. (VOF) in 1994 along with Richelieu Allison.  The organization set its mission to work as an advocacy organization for the rights of children in Liberia. Over the years, it developed close connections with the United Nations and worked as an implementing partner for the United Nations Children's Fund (UNICEF).  VOF provided informal health care and education to children across Liberia through a network of more than 4,000 volunteers.."

In 1996 Weeks, now 15, founded and chaired the Children's Disarmament Campaign. With support from UNICEF, the campaign lobbied a deadline for the disarmament of child soldiers, meeting warring faction, political, spiritual leaders and heads of civic societies to set a date for the disarmament of child soldiers. Several marches, indoor programs and publicity campaigns were also held to attract attention to the cause.

In 1997, with the holding of general disarmament in Liberia, Weeks established Liberia's first children's information service, The Children's Bureau of Information, which worked alongside Search for Common Ground/Talking Drum Studio to produce radio programs aimed at reintegrating child soldiers into the community. The 15-minute weekly broadcasts are aired on three local radio stations.

In 1998, the Liberian government of Charles Taylor made several attempts to assassinate Weeks because of a report he issued on the Liberian government's involvement in the training of child soldiers.

Fearing for his safety, Weeks went into hiding for more than three weeks before crossing into neighboring Ivory Coast under an assumed name and disguised as a traditional dancer.  Only 17 years old when he fled his country, he was granted political asylum in the United States.

Education and life in the United States

Once he arrived in the United States, Weeks enrolled and completed his final year of high school at Glasgow High School in Newark, Delaware. He then enrolled at Northfield Mount Hermon School in Northfield, MA, where he completed a post-graduate program.  In 2001, he enrolled at Amherst College in Massachusetts and received a BA in Political Science and History in 2005. In 2008, he received his master's degree from the University of Pennsylvania and was subsequently awarded an Honorary Doctorate from Amherst College in 2012.

Youth Action International

While at Amherst College, Weeks founded Youth Action International (YAI), the mission of which is to provide education, health care and economic empowerment for children and young people affected by war.

YAI was established in 2005 to develop and implement programs that alleviate the suffering of children and youth affected by war, and empower them to reach their full potential. The organization is a growing network of young people, primarily volunteers, who utilize grassroots techniques to support war-affected communities in improving the lives of their children.  YAI has volunteer chapters at universities and colleges across the United States, an administrative office in Michigan, and field offices in Liberia, Sierra Leone and Uganda. YAI's programs are strategically developed to break the cycles of violence and poverty.

Major accomplishments of Youth Action International include providing services to over 150,000 people in West and East Africa since 2005.

Recognition and awards

Weeks remains a vocal advocate for children's rights around the world.  His annual speaking tour reaches more than 40,000 people.  He has also been selected for many awards, including the MLK Peace Medal, the 1998 Goodwill Games Medal for heroism in the face of adversity, and the 2007 Golden Brick Award.

On July 26, 2007, the President of Liberia, Her Excellency Ellen Johnson Sirleaf,  bestowed Liberia's highest honor on Weeks for "sacrificial and dedicated services to the people of Liberia."  The President formally decorated him as Knight Grand Commander in the Humane Order of African Redemption during programs marking Liberia's 160th Anniversary in Grand Bassa County, Liberia. Weeks became one of the youngest recipients of Liberia's highest honor.

In a special proclamation marking the conferral of the distinction, President Sirleaf wrote:

Now therefore, in recognition of the outstanding success you have so laudably achieved so far in your career, and for the pride you bring to all Liberians, I, Ellen Johnson Sirleaf, by virtue of the power vested in me as Grand Master of the Order of Distinction of the Republic of Liberia do hereby admit you, Kimmie L. Weeks into the HUMANE ORDER OF AFRICAN REDEMPTION with the grade of KNIGHT GRAND COMMANDER.

By Presidential request, Weeks also served as National Orator for programs marking Liberia's Independence Day Celebration.  He spoke on the topic "Liberia at 160: Reclaiming the Future".  The 30-minute speech, which was hailed by local newspapers as "one of the most powerful and moving speeches in Liberian history".

In 2007, his photo and bio appeared on 20 million bags of Doritos. Weeks is the subject of a major photo exhibit, the book Peace in our Lifetime, and many smaller publications.

In 2008 and 2009, he received the Liberia National Excellence Award, and the Wangari Mathai Global Citizenship Award.

In 2011, Amherst College conferred an honorary doctorate degree on Weeks, making him the youngest person in the school's history to receive an honorary degree.

He was named a Community hero by The My Hero Project.

Current

Kimmie Weeks currently serves as Executive Director of Youth Action International.  The organization provides education, health care and economic empowerment for children and youth in post-war African countries.  Youth Action International has impacted more than 150,000 lives since 2005. Weeks is also a member of the World Economic Forum's Global Agenda Council and a member of the Young Global Leaders Program. Weeks also serves in a part-time capacity as Chief Corporate Communications Strategist for Liberia second largest GSM company called Cellcom.  In 2012, Liberian President Ellen Johnson Sirleaf appointed Weeks as Chairman of the Board of Directors for the Liberia Water and Sewer Corporation.  The primary immediate task of the corporation is to provide safe drinking piped water to more than 800,000 Liberians in the capital for the first time since 1990.

References

External links
 Kimmie Weeks official website
 Youth Action International website
 Youth Action International Youtube channel
 4Real TV Series
 Kimmie Weeks calls US Attention to Food Crisis
 Man With a Mission: Visitor to share African dreams, nightmares
 British and American Team arrived in Sierra Leone to assess creation of Women Centre

 Kimmie Weeks discusses aid

1981 births
Living people
Liberian expatriates in the United States
Amherst College alumni
Children's rights activists
Liberian activists
Northfield Mount Hermon School alumni
People from Monrovia
Liberian people
Americo-Liberian people
People of Americo-Liberian descent
Liberian refugees